A Salt with a Deadly Pepa is the second studio album by American hip hop group Salt-N-Pepa, released on August 2, 1988, by London Records and Next Plateau Records. The album reached number 38 on the Billboard 200 and number eight on the Top R&B/Hip-Hop Albums chart. On December 1, 1988, it was certified gold by the Recording Industry Association of America (RIAA). The album spawned three singles, the top-10 R&B entry "Shake Your Thang"; the top-20 R&B entry "Get Up Everybody (Get Up)"; and "Twist and Shout", which peaked at number four on the UK Singles Chart.

Track listing

Personnel
Credits adapted from the liner notes of A Salt with a Deadly Pepa.

Technical
 Hurby Luv Bug – production
 The Invincibles – production
 Andre DeBourg – recording
 Herb Powers Jr. – mastering

Artwork
 Janette Beckman – photography
 Jeff Faville – cover design and concept
 Russ Parr – album title

Charts

Weekly charts

Year-end charts

Certifications

References

1988 albums
Albums produced by Hurby Azor
London Records albums
Next Plateau Entertainment albums
Salt-N-Pepa albums